Pisonia donnellsmithii is a species of plant in the family Nyctaginaceae. It is found in El Salvador and Guatemala. It is threatened by habitat loss.

References

donnellsmithii
Vulnerable plants
Taxonomy articles created by Polbot